Finland–Turkey relations are foreign relations between Finland and Turkey. Finland has an embassy in Ankara and an honorary consulate general in Istanbul and other honorary consulates in Adana, Alanya, Antalya, Belek, Bodrum, İzmir, and Kayseri. Turkey has an embassy in Helsinki. 
Both countries are full members of  the Council of Europe, the Organisation for Economic Co-operation and Development (OECD), the Organization for Security and Co-operation in Europe (OSCE) and the Union for the Mediterranean.

History

The Ottoman Empire recognized the independence of Finland on February 21, 1918. Diplomatic relations between them were established on September 12, 1926. Relations between the two countries were described as being friendly though due to geographical separation, co-operation was limited. The first ambassador to Turkey was established in 1931 and an embassy in 1940. Finnish President at the time, Urho Kekkonen, made a state visit to Turkey in 1971, being the first Nordic head of state to visit Turkey in 250 years. Finnish tourism to Turkey increased in the 1980s, when destinations were established first to Marmara region and later to Alanya and Side. Finland was among the first countries to support Turkey's accession to the EU.

In 2008, the front door of the Turkish embassy in Helsinki was set on fire. The day prior to that, a Kurdish demonstration was staged by the embassy. Four young men of Turkish-Kurdish background were brought into custody. The Police stated it was politically motivated.
Finland stopped selling weapons to Turkey in 2019 due to Turkey's military operation in Syria.
In 2020, a Finnish citizen was arrested in Turkey, being suspected of having links to ISIS. Finland's Ministry for Foreign Affairs reported that it was aware of the arrest but refused to comment on it.

In October 2021, in the wake of the appeal for the release of Turkish activist Osman Kavala signed by 10 western countries, Turkish president Recep Tayyip Erdoğan ordered his foreign minister to declare the Finnish ambassador persona non grata, alongside the other 9 ambassadors. However, the ambassadors did not receive any formal notice to leave the country and Erdoğan eventually stepped back.
In October 2021, Finnish Prime Minister Sanna Marin reacted sharply to Turkish President Recep Tayyip Erdoğan, who declared his country's ambassador deported. And Marin also asked Erdoğan to implement the European Court of Human Rights decisions and to respect the ECHR judgments.

Finnish NATO bid  

In 2022, Turkey opposed Finland joining NATO because according to Turkey it hosts “terrorist organisations” which act against Turkey (including the PKK, PYD, YPG and Gulen movement). (However, the Gülen movement is on the list of terrorist organizations in Turkey. However, it is not on the list of terrorist organizations in Finland. and the PKK is on the list of terrorist organizations in Turkey and Finland). In May 2022, Turkey quickly blocked the applications for NATO membership of Finland's from proceeding through an accelerated process. In May 2022, Turkey vetoed Finland's NATO membership. Turkey has demanded Finland and Sweden to extradite alleged terrorists linked to the Gülen movement and the Kurdish militant group PKK. By June 2022 Finland had received 10 extradition requests, of which two were handed to the Turkish authorities. There are around 16,000 Kurds in Finland, some of them being from Turkey.
Turkey asked Finland and Sweden not to support the Gülen movement and the PKK. 
Turkey asked Finland and Sweden not to support terrorism. 
Turkey asked Finland and Sweden to address Turkey's security concerns.
In September 2022, Turkey requested the extradition of 6 Turkish citizens from Finland. However, Finland did not respond positively and refused.
Turkey demanded that Finland end its support to the Gülen movement and the PKK.

Economic relations
Turkey is an important trading partner for Finland. Trade between the two countries totaled $1.3 billion in 2018. Turkey is among the most popular tourist destinations for Finns, with 230,000 Finns travelling to Turkey in 2015.

Diaspora
As of 2021, there were 11,392 people in Finland of Turkish background, of which 8,841 were born in Turkey and 2,551 in Finland. Around 2,000 Finns live in the Alanya region alone.

State visits

Resident diplomatic missions
 Finland has an embassy in Ankara.
 Turkey has an embassy in Helsinki.

See also 
 Foreign relations of Finland
 Foreign relations of Turkey 

 Turks in Finland

References

External links 
  Embassy of Turkey in Helsinki (in Turkish and English)
  Turkey's Ministry of Foreign Affairs about political, economical and commercial relations with Finland
  Ministry for Foreign Affairs of Finland about relations with Turkey
  Embassy of Finland in Ankara

 

 
Turkey
Bilateral relations of Turkey